Telmatobius scrocchii is a species of frog in the family Telmatobiidae.
It is endemic to Argentina.
Its natural habitat is rivers.
It is threatened by habitat loss.

References

scrocchii
Amphibians of the Andes
Amphibians of Argentina
Endemic fauna of Argentina
Taxa named by Raymond Laurent
Amphibians described in 1986
Taxonomy articles created by Polbot